Ahava rabbah (Hebrew: אהבה רבה, [with an] abundant love, also Ahavah raba and other variant English spellings) is a prayer and blessing that is recited by followers of Ashkenazi Judaism during Shacharit (the morning religious services of Judaism) immediately prior to the Shema, the "Hear O Israel..." prayer. Sephardi Jews, as well as many of those whose follow Nusach Sefard, begin this blessing with the words "Ahavat Olam" instead of Ahava rabbah; which is not to be confused with the shorter blessing of Ahavat Olam recited by both Sefardim and Ashkenazim during Maariv (with slight differences in their form).

The text of this prayer was fixed in the period of the Geonim.

Content
This prayer is an expression of thanks for the love God has given the people. It thanks God for the gift of the Torah, which provides life, and for making the Jewish people the chosen nation.

The prayer contains multiple requests to God. One of them is to be enlightened with the Torah. Another is for God to protect us from shame; it is stated that those who cleave to a life of mitzvot will not be shamed. Another is that the Jewish people be gathered from the four corners of the world and returned to Israel.

Hebrew text: 

English translation:

Practices and laws

Ahava rabbah is recited during Shacharit, and Ahavat Olam during Maariv. The Talmud provides differing views on which one should be recited. As a compromise, Ahava Rabbah (being the longer of the two) is recited in the morning, and Ahavat Olam in the evening.

In many communities, during Ahava rabbah, at the words "Bring us in peace from the four corners of the earth [to our land]", the four corners of the tzitzit are gathered in one's hand. They are held throughout the Shema and kissed four times during the third paragraph of the Shema and once during Emet Veyatziv (the paragraph following the Shema) and then released. The gathering of the tzitzit on these words is symbolic of the gathering of the Jewish people to its land.

Ahava rabbah is recited immediately before the Shema because its recital brings on the obligation to immediately learn, or at the very least, recite verses from the Torah. Since the Shema is composed of verses from the Torah, its recital fulfills that obligation.

The recitation of Ahava Rabbah fulfills the mitzvah of saying a blessing before Torah study. Normally, verses from the Torah are recited during Birkat HaShachar. But if one forgets to recite these verses then, the obligation is met through the recitation of Ahava Rabbah. However, the recitation of the Shema does not meet the requirement for learning after reciting the blessing on Torah study, even though it is composed of verses from the Torah, and one must learn something immediately following prayers in order for Ahava Rabbah to work in this capacity.

References

Shacharit
Hebrew words and phrases in Jewish prayers and blessings
Siddur of Orthodox Judaism